Costanza Farnese (December 19, 1500 in Rome – May 23, 1545 in Rome) was a daughter of Alessandro Farnese and Silvia Ruffini. Born before her father became Pope Paul III, her siblings were Pier Luigi, Paul, Ranuccio and Lucrezia. 

She married Bosio II Sforza, count of Santa Fiora e Cotignola, they had: 
 Guido Ascanio
 Alessandro Sforza
 Sforza Sforza, whose children were:
 Francesco Sforza 
 Alessandro, 7th count of Santa Fiora, duke of Seni and prince of Valmontone, father of cardinal Federico Sforza.
Costanza Sforza
 Mario (1530-1591), count of S. Fiora, married Fulvia Conti
 Faustina Sforza, married Muzio Sforza of Caravaggio
 Francesca Sforza, married Girolamo Orsini
 Camilla, married Besso Ferrero of Masserano

References

Sources

1500 births
1545 deaths
Costanza
Papal family members
Nobility from Rome
16th-century Italian women
Illegitimate children of popes
Women and the papacy